The Hasty Heart is a 1949 war drama film, an Anglo-American co-production  starring Ronald Reagan, Patricia Neal, and Richard Todd and directed by Vincent Sherman. The film is based on the 1945 play of the same name by John Patrick.

The Hasty Heart tells the story of a group of wounded Allied soldiers in a Pacific theatre mobile surgery unit immediately after World War II ends who, after initial resentment and ostracism, rally around a loner, an unappreciative Scottish soldier they know is dying.

The title is taken from the proverb "sorrow is born in the hasty heart" which is stated several times in the film.

Plot
In Burma during the Pacific Theatre of World War II in 1945, a group of wounded Allied soldiers are at a makeshift British military hospital in the jungle. As they have all been there for some time, they have a strong bond. "Yank" (Ronald Reagan) is the lone American there, recovering from malaria, along with Tommy (Howard Marion-Crawford), the Englishman, Kiwi (Ralph Michael), the New Zealander, Digger (John Sherman), the Australian, and Blossom (Orlando Martins), the African. They are all under the care of Sister Margaret Parker (Patricia Neal).

Lt Col Dunn (Anthony Nicholls), the senior doctor of the hospital, tells the men that they will be receiving a new patient soon, and that they should be extra kind to him.  He is a Scot, and, while he seems to have recovered from his operation, his abnormal kidney means that he will die within a few weeks. Dunn tells the men that the Scot will be outwardly healthy until one day he will suddenly die when his kidney fails. When the Scot arrives, Cpl. Lachlan 'Lachie' MacLachlan (Richard Todd) is very gruff and mean. He is constantly suspicious of his fellow patients attempting to make friends with him.

Margaret tries to convince Lachie to buy a regimental kilt, something he feels is too expensive to purchase because he recently bought a house in Scotland to which he intends to return. However, during Lachie's 24th birthday party, Margaret gives him a kilt, and the rest of his friends contribute something for his uniform. Lachie is proud, and they all pose for photos, with the others trying to answer the question of whether he wears anything under his kilt.

Lachie warms to the soldiers and opens up about his past, telling them "They say sorrow is born in the hasty heart." He reveals to Margaret that his aloof and suspicious behavior is the result of great cruelty inflicted on him in his youth as an illegitimate child. Later he confesses to Yank that he is in love with Margaret and will propose to her. Yank tries to convince him otherwise, but when Lachie does propose she accepts because that is what will make him really happy.

Dunn comes to the ward and tells Lachie that he can return to Scotland immediately if he wishes. When Lachie asks why he is receiving special treatment, the doctor tells him the truth about his condition and that his death is imminent. Lachie explodes at his friends, thinking they befriended him only because he was sick and dying. He decides to return to Scotland. Blossom offers him a necklace, but when Lachie rejects it, Yank explains that Blossom does not speak English and therefore could not have known that Lachie was dying. As he is leaving he breaks down and says he does not want to die alone.  With that realization he softens and decides to stay on and have his picture taken in his uniform with the men, happy to be with true friends at last in his last few days.

Cast

 Richard Todd – Cpl. Lachlan "Lachie" MacLachlan, the Scot
 Ronald Reagan – Yank, the American
 Patricia Neal – Sister Margaret Parker
 Anthony Nicholls – Lieutenant Colonel Dunn
 Howard Marion-Crawford – Tommy, the Englishman

 Ralph Michael – Kiwi, the New Zealander
 John Sherman – Digger, the Australian
 Alfie Bass – Orderly
Orlando Martins – Blossom, the African
Robert Douglas – Off-Screen Narrator (uncredited)

Production
Warner Bros. bought the film rights to the play from American dramatist John Patrick for $100,000 and a percentage of the profits in 1945. It originally announced John Dall would play the lead of Lachie.  Instead, Todd was cast over Gordon Jackson.

"I wasn't right at all for the nurse", said Patricia Neal. "But it was my first sympathetic part, at least."

Reception

Box office
The film ranked tenth among popular films at the British box office in 1949.

Critical reaction
Richard Todd  was nominated for the Academy Award for Best Actor. The film also won two Golden Globes (Richard Todd for Most Promising Newcomer – Male and for Best Film Promoting International Understanding).

TV remakes
The Hasty Heart was remade for television in 1957 and 1983, the latter starring Gregory Harrison, Perry King and Cheryl Ladd. King won a Golden Globe nomination for his performance.

References

External links

 
 
 
 
1952 Best Plays radio adaptation of original play at Internet Archive

1940s war drama films
1949 films
1949 drama films
British black-and-white films
British films based on plays
Remakes of British films
British World War II films
British war drama films
Burma Campaign films
Films directed by Vincent Sherman
Films scored by Jack Beaver
Films set in 1945
Films set in hospitals
Films set in jungles
Films set in Myanmar
Films shot at Associated British Studios
Films with screenplays by Ranald MacDougall
Plays by John Patrick
Warner Bros. films
1940s English-language films
1940s British films